Carinodrillia adonis is a species of sea snail, a marine gastropod mollusk in the family Pseudomelatomidae.

Description
The length of the shell varies between 17 mm and 25 mm.

Distribution
This marine species occurs in the Pacific Ocean off Mexico, Panama, Peru and the Galapagos Islands.

References

 Pilsbry, 1932: Proc. Acad. Nat. Sci. Philadelphia, vol. 84, pp.:33–144, 7 figs., 1–17 pls., 2 photographs
 Pilsbry & Lowe, 1932. West Mexican and Central American mollusks, collected by H.N. Lowe 1929–31.
 Hertlein, L. G., and A. M. Strong. "Marine mollusks collected at the Galapagos Islands during the voyage of the Velero III, 1931–1932." Essays in the Natural Sciences in honor of Captain Allan Hancock on the occasion of his birthday, 26 July (1955): 111–145.

External links
 
 

adonis
Gastropods described in 1932